Sri Shakthi Institute of Engineering & Technology (SIET) is an autonomous engineering institute located in Coimbatore, Tamil Nadu, India. Established in 2006, it is affiliated to Anna University. , four of its programmes are accredited by the National Board of Accreditation (NBA).

Under Graduate Courses 
 B.Tech - Agricultural Engineering  
 B.E - Biomedical Engineering  
 B.Tech - Biotechnology  
 B.E - Civil Engineering  
 B.E - Computer Science and Engineering  
 B.E - Electrical and Electronics Engineering  
 B.E - Electronics and Communication Engineering  
 B.Tech - Food Technology  
 B.Tech - Information Technology  
 B.E - Mechanical Engineering
 B.Tech - Artificial Intelligence and Data Science
 B.Tech - Artificial Intelligence and Machine Learning

Post Graduate Courses 
 M.E - Computer Science and Engineering  
 M.E - VLSI Design  
 M.E - CAD/CAM  
 M.E - Embedded System Technologies  
 M.E - Structural Engineering

Research Centers (Ph.D) 
 Department of Electronics and Communication Engineering
 Department of Computer Science Engineering
 Department of Electrical and Electronics Engineering
 Department of Mechanical Engineering
 Department of Civil Engineering
 Department of Physics
 Department of Chemistry

Annual Events 
 International Conference on Computer Communication and Informatics (ICCCI)
 Kalam - Inter-Collegiate Techno cultural fest
 Velaan Thiruvizha

References

External links 
 

Engineering colleges in Coimbatore
2006 establishments in Tamil Nadu
Educational institutions established in 2006